Mikre Beach is the beach extending 2.2 km on the southeast coast of Snow Island in the South Shetland Islands, Antarctica.  It is bounded by Cape Conway to the southwest, the island's ice cap to the northwest and Pazardzhik Point to the northeast, and is snow-free in summer.

The beach is named after the settlement of Mikre in Northern Bulgaria.

Location
Bulgarian mapping in 2009.

Maps
 L.L. Ivanov. Antarctica: Livingston Island and Greenwich, Robert, Snow and Smith Islands. Scale 1:120000 topographic map.  Troyan: Manfred Wörner Foundation, 2009.   (Updated second edition 2010.  )
 L.L. Ivanov. Antarctica: Livingston Island and Greenwich, Robert, Snow and Smith Islands. Scale 1:120000 topographic map.  Troyan: Manfred Wörner Foundation, 2009.  
 Antarctic Digital Database (ADD). Scale 1:250000 topographic map of Antarctica. Scientific Committee on Antarctic Research (SCAR). Since 1993, regularly upgraded and updated.

References
 Mikre Beach. SCAR Composite Antarctic Gazetteer
 Bulgarian Antarctic Gazetteer. Antarctic Place-names Commission. (details in Bulgarian, basic data in English)

External links
 Mikre Beach. Copernix satellite image

Beaches of the South Shetland Islands
Bulgaria and the Antarctic